The New Paper is a Singaporean newspaper in tabloid form. It was originally published as a "noon paper", but since 2016 has been published daily as a freesheet in the morning from 7 a.m. onwards.

History
First launched on 26 July 1988, by Singapore Press Holdings (SPH), it had an average daily circulation of 101,600 in August 2010, according to SPH.

In 1991, the paper organised the New Paper Big Walk, a mass-participation walking event. The event came to be held annually in Singapore. It holds the official Guinness World Record as world's largest walk when a record-breaking 77,500 participants joined on 21 May 2000.

There is also a noon edition that hits the newsstands on Mondays and Thursdays that gives more special coverage of late-night association football matches that occur after the morning edition goes to press. The New Paper was Singapore's second-highest circulating paid English-language newspaper before it became a free newspaper on 1 December 2016.

The New Paper is noted for its coverage of sports news, particularly of association football (e.g. the UEFA Champions League and the Premier League). Amongst its sports journalists, Iain Macintosh was voted second runner-up for Best Football Journalist held by Soccerlens.com website in 2010.

FiRST which was originally published as a monthly magazine, merged with The New Paper in May 2009, and was published as a weekly pull-out rather than monthly.

The New Paper is often compared to the tabloid Today, although the latter positions itself against The Straits Times. The New Paper targets readers with more eye-catching tabloid journalism featuring sensationalist headlines. It tends to focus on local human-interest stories, with extensive sections on entertainment, fashion and sports. There is, in comparison with The Straits Times, very little coverage of international news. However, according to SPH, The New Paper presents "news with sharp angles not seen elsewhere", and perceives its paper to be "stylish", "arresting" and "easy to read" while tackling "complex issues".

The newspaper's average daily sales had dropped to 60,000, according to Warren Fernandez, Editor-in-Chief of the English/Malay/Tamil Media group of SPH,  before it became a freesheet.

On 17 October 2016, Singapore Press Holdings announced a 10% cut of staff, and that My Paper and The New Paper (TNP) would be merged to form a revamped TNP that will be a freesheet on 1 December 2016.

Distributed free of charge, The New Paper aims to reach a circulation of 300,000, matching Today, the other English-language free newspaper in Singapore.

On 10 December 2021, The New Paper ceased its print edition and went fully digital.

See also

List of newspapers in Singapore
List of newspapers

References

External links
 Official website
 

1988 establishments in Singapore
Newspapers published in Singapore
Free daily newspapers
SPH Media Trust
Online newspapers with defunct print editions
English-language newspapers published in Asia
Publications established in 1988